Echo Lake, also known as Crotched Pond, is a lake located in the towns of Fayette, Mount Vernon and Readfield, Maine. One of the major bodies of water in the Winthrop Lakes Region, the lake is known for its rocky shores, scenery, deep cool water, and naturally reproducing lake trout population. A public boat launch is located on the north shore in Mount Vernon off State Route #41.

Camp Winnebago, a summer camp for boys, is located on the southwest shore of Echo Lake.

References

External links
Survey and Map from State of Maine 
Winthrop Lakes Region Chamber of Commerce

Lakes of Kennebec County, Maine
Reservoirs in Maine